DWEE (107.1 FM) D'Ani Kita Radio is a radio station owned and operated by the Department of Agriculture. Its studio and transmitter are located inside the Pampanga State Agricultural University campus, Magalang.

References

Radio stations in Pampanga
Radio stations established in 2021